Cultripalpa partita is a species of moth of the family Erebidae first described by Achille Guenée in 1852.

Distribution
It is found from India, the Seychelles to Japan, Malaysia, Philippines, Australia and Vietnam.

References

Images at Noctuidae.de

Erebidae
Calpinae
Moths of Asia
Moths of Japan
Moths described in 1852